The Kural Peedam Award is a lifetime achievement presidential award given to eminent scholars of classical Tamil.  The award was instituted in 2005 by the Central Institute of Classical Tamil under the aegis of the Ministry of Human Resource Development in India. Two awards are presented annually, one for a person of Indian origin and another for a scholar of non-Indian origin. the award includes of a cash prize of 500,000 (just over $8,000 USD), a citation, and a shawl.

Recipients
 Dr. George L. Hart (2005–2006)
 Dr. Jaroslav Vacek
 Dr. John Ralston Marr
 Professor Francois Gros (2008–2009)
 Dr. Eva Wilden

See also
 Thiruvalluvar Award

References

Indian awards
Tamil Nadu awards
Tirukkural
Memorials to Valluvar
Tamil culture
2005 establishments in India
Awards established in 2005
Civil awards and decorations of India
Lists of Indian award winners